Diela may refer to:

Diela, Burkina Faso, town in Burkina Faso
Yelü Diela, inventor of the Khitan small script and younger brother of Khitan Emperor Yelü Abaoji (872–926)